The Greenwich line is a short railway line in South London that follows part of the route of the London and Greenwich Railway, which was the first railway line in London.

The line diverges from the South Eastern Main Line at North Kent East junction and runs as far as Charlton junction where it connects with the North Kent Line.

Stations

History

The line was electrified with the other SE&CR local routes to Dartford on 6 June 1926 by Southern Railway.

From 12 January 2015, services using the Greenwich line were no longer able to serve London Charing Cross. This is due to the Thameslink Programme work, which removed the diamond crossing at Spa Road Junction, located between London Bridge and Deptford. As a result of this, trains using the Greenwich line could no longer reach the lines going into Charing Cross. To compensate for the loss of this, London Cannon Street was given revised service times, with it being open seven days a week and until the end of service.

Service patterns
Passenger services on the line are operated by Southeastern using Class 376, 465 & 466 trains and Thameslink using Class 700.

The current service pattern is as follows:

Off-peak & Saturday:
2tph between London Cannon Street & Slade Green, continuing to London Cannon Street via Bexleyheath Line
2tph between London Cannon Street & Slade Green, continuing to London Cannon Street via Dartford Loop Line
2tph between Luton & Rainham

Sunday:
2tph between London Cannon Street & Dartford
2tph between Luton & Rainham

References 

Railway lines in London
Standard gauge railways in Kent
Standard gauge railways in London
Railway lines opened in 1836